Takli Bobade is a village in Parbhani taluka of Parbhani district of Maharashtra state in India.

Demography
According to the 2011 census of India, Takli Bobade had a population of 2882, of which 1502 were male and 1380 were female. The average sex ratio of the village was 919, which was lower than the Maharashtra state average of 929. The literacy rate was 67.58% compared to 82.3% for the state. Male literacy rate was 78% while female literacy rate was 66%.

Geography and Transport
Following table shows distance of Takli Bobade from some of major cities.

References

Villages in Parbhani district